The Gur is a river in Khabarovsk Krai, Russia. The river was known as "Khungari" (Хунгари) until the 1972 Renaming of geographical sites in the Russian Far East.
The town of Gurskoe, as well as the villages of Kenai, Uktur and Snezhny are located by the river. Gold mining is being developed in the river basin.

The Gur Swamps are an important wetland area located on the right bank of the river in the Nanaysky District.

Course
The Gur is a right tributary of the Amur. It has its sources in the slopes of the Sikhote-Alin and about two thirds of the river basin is located within the northwestern part of this mountain range. In its upper course the Gur heads roughly northwards its riverbed is largely undivided. Further downstream it bends and flows roughly towards the west. Leaving the mountains it flows in its last  stretch meandering across the mainly swampy Middle Amur Lowland. 

Finally the Gur joins the Amur split in several branches  from its mouth.

Fauna
There are important fisheries in the Gur. Salmon species, including chum salmon and pink salmon, enter the river for spawning. In the summer the lower course of the Gur is a feeding ground for whitefish, Siberian roach, rudd, carp and catfish.

See also
List of rivers of Russia

References

External links 

Rivers of Khabarovsk Krai